Sarčievo is a village in Štip Municipality in North Macedonia.

In August 2010, the village entered the Guinness Book of World Records for cooking the biggest pot of beans in recorded history. Over 3,100 litres of beans were cooked in a four-tonne pot.

Demographics
According to the 2002 census, the village had a total of 21 inhabitants. Ethnic groups in the village include:

Macedonians 21

References

Villages in Štip Municipality